Scoring 50 goals in one season is one of the most celebrated individual achievements in the National Hockey League (NHL). In , Maurice Richard became the first player to score 50 goals in a season. Fifty-goal seasons increased in frequency during the 1970s and 1980s as the schedule was extended to 80 games and offense increased across the league. By 1980, it had been reached 24 times in NHL history; the plateau was reached 76 times in the 1980s alone.

He also shares the record for most 50-goal seasons with Mike Bossy and Alexander Ovechkin, each having reached the milestone nine times in their careers. After this, offence declined across the league and the schedule was reduced back to the present 82 games, and with these developments the number of players to reach the total declined.

Since , there have been four completed 82-game NHL seasons (the first being ) in which no player scored fifty goals, in addition, no player scored fifty goals in any of the four seasons of play shortened by lockouts or the COVID-19 pandemic.

History
Joe Malone scored 44 goals for the Montreal Canadiens in the NHL's inaugural season of —a season with a twenty-game schedule. It was a record that stood nearly 30 years. He was as obsessed with reaching the 50-goal mark as his opponents were with preventing it. Richard faced opponents who repeatedly elbowed, hooked and held him in an effort to prevent him from reaching 50. As a result, he scored only seven goals in his final 13 games. Richard scored his 50th goal, in 50 games, in the third period of Montreal's final game of the season against the Boston Bruins. The league introduced the Maurice "Rocket" Richard Trophy in his honour in 1999, and the Canadiens donated the physical trophy.

Early in the 1960s, Chicago Black Hawks teammates Stan Mikita and Bobby Hull began experimenting with curved blades, noticing that different bends made shots more unpredictable for goaltenders. It was the first of five times he would reach the milestone.

By 1980, 24 players had reached the mark. He did so by scoring two goals in the final five minutes of the Islanders' 50th game. The 1980s represented one of the highest scoring eras in NHL history: on 76 occasions, a player scored 50 goals in a season. In that season, Gretzky scored five goals in his 39th game of the season to total 50, bettering Richard and Bossy by 11 games as the fastest to reach the mark.

Bossy, Gretzky and Alexander Ovechkin are tied for the most 50-goal seasons, with 9 each. Bossy holds the record for most consecutive 50-goal seasons, with 9. Ovechkin is still an active player.

The Oilers also hold the record for most seasons, five, with multiple players achieving a 50-goal season; the Los Angeles Kings are second, with four seasons with multiple 50-goal scorers.

Among the 50-goal scorers that season was Teemu Selanne, who scored 76 goals as a rookie, surpassing Bossy's record for first-year players by 23 goals. The next season, Brett Hull achieved his fifth 50-goal season, matching father Bobby's five 50-goal seasons three decades earlier; the two are the only father-son pair to each achieve a 50-goal season, let alone achieving it five times each.

As teams shifted their focus to defensive play rather than offensive, scoring rapidly declined in the late 1990s.

Only five players reached the 50-goal mark between 1999 and 2004: Pavel Bure, Joe Sakic, Jaromir Jagr, Jarome Iginla, and Milan Hejduk. Following the 2004–05 lockout that cancelled the season, the league introduced numerous rule changes designed to increase scoring. Ovechkin is the oldest player to record a 50-goal season at 36 years and 215 days old; the previous oldest was Johnny Bucyk at 35 years and 308 days old.

Players and their 50-goal seasons

   

Key
 Player is active in the NHL in 
 Inducted into the Hockey Hall of Fame
(#) Denotes the consecutive count, only if more than one, that player achieved a 50-goal season

References

50 goal seasons